Robert 'Bob' Middleton is a former Australian international lawn bowler.

Bowls career

World Championships
Middleton won a singles silver medal, a pairs bronze medal with Don Woolnough and a team bronze at the 1976 World Outdoor Bowls Championship in Johannesburg and eight years later won a bronze medal in the 1984 World Outdoor Championships in Aberdeen with bowls partner Kenny Williams.

Club
He was fourteen times Mitcham club champion and was a sale agent by trade.

Awards
He was inducted into the Australian Hall of Fame.

References

Australian male bowls players
Living people
1935 births